The 2021 Pietermaritzburg Power Outage is a power outage that began in December 2021.

Background 
On 16 December 2021 the Northdale primary substation exploded in the early hours leaving individuals in the Msunduzi municipality in the dark for over a week.

Residents began protesting and blocking National roads after Eskom’s progress in the repair seemed to be nonexistent A local petition was also able to gain over 1,200 signatures.

See also 
 South African Energy Crisis

References 

Pietermaritzburg
Power outages
History of KwaZulu-Natal
Pietermaritzburg
Electric power in South Africa